

Births and deaths

Births
 Kathryn Tickell (1967)

Deaths
 William Kimber (1872–1961)
 Sam Larner (1878–1965)

Recordings
 1960: Singing The Fishing (Ewan MacColl)
 1962: The Body Blow (Ewan MacColl)
 1963: The Iron Muse (A.L. Lloyd, Ewan MacColl, Anne Briggs)
 1964: The Fight Game (Ewan MacColl)
 1965: John Renbourn (John Renbourn)
 1966: Songs of a Shropshire Farm Worker (Fred Jordan)
 1965: Frost and Fire (The Watersons)
 1966: The Bird in the Bush (Anne Briggs, Frankie Armstrong, A.L. Lloyd)
 1966: A Yorkshire Garland (Watersons)
 1967: Leviathan (A.L. Lloyd)
 1967: Nicola (Bert Jansch)
 1968: Fairport Convention (Fairport Convention)
 1968: What We Did on Our Holidays (Fairport Convention)
 1968: The Pentangle (Pentangle)
 1969: Unhalfbricking (Fairport Convention)
 1969: Liege and Lief (Fairport Convention)

See also
Music of the United Kingdom (1960s)

English folk music by date
1960s in British music
1960s in England